Specific force is defined as the non-gravitational force per unit mass.

Specific force (also called g-force and mass-specific force) is measured in meters/second² (m·s−2) which is the units for acceleration. Thus, specific force is not actually a force, but a type of acceleration. However, the (mass-)specific force is not a coordinate-acceleration, but rather a proper acceleration, which is the acceleration relative to free-fall. Forces, specific forces, and proper accelerations are the same in all reference frames, but coordinate accelerations are frame-dependent. For free bodies, the specific force is the cause of, and a measure of, the body's proper acceleration.

The g-force acceleration is the same as the specific force. The acceleration of an object free falling towards the earth depends on the reference frame (it disappears in the free-fall frame, also called the inertial frame), but any g-force "acceleration" will be present in all frames. This specific force is zero for freely-falling objects, since gravity acting alone does not produce g-forces or specific forces.

Accelerometers on the surface of the Earth measure a constant 9.8 m/s^2 even when they are not accelerating (that is, when they do not undergo coordinate acceleration). This is because accelerometers measure the proper acceleration produced by the g-force exerted by the ground (gravity acting alone never produces g-force or specific force). Accelerometers measure specific force (proper acceleration), which is the acceleration relative to free-fall, not the "standard" acceleration that is relative to a coordinate system.

Hydraulics
In open channel hydraulics, specific force has a different meaning:

where Q is the discharge, g is the acceleration due to gravity, A is the cross-sectional area of flow, and z is the depth of the centroid of flow area A.

See also
Acceleration
Proper acceleration

References 

Physical quantities
Hydraulic engineering
Acceleration